Dr. Rufus Hessberg was an Army Medical Corps doctor during World War II and later was a pioneer aeromedical scientist. He served as an early instructor at the Air Rescue Specialists Course at Gunter AFB, Alabama in 1949, teaching some of the Air Force's first Pararescuemen. He went on to head the animal research group for Project Mercury. He served for several years as an Executive Vice President of the Aerospace Medical Association before retiring in 1991.

References 

United States Army Medical Corps officers
United States Army personnel of World War II